René Sjøgren Christensen (born 21 January 1988) is a former Danish professional football midfielder.

He played two years in the Danish Superliga side AC Horsens, before giving up a professional career and start working and take an education.

References

1988 births
Living people
Danish men's footballers
AC Horsens players
Danish Superliga players
Association football defenders
21st-century Danish politicians